Viktor Pongrácz (born 18 September 1995) is a Hungarian football player who currently plays for Tiszakécske FC.

Career

Pápa
On 28 February 2015, Pongrácz played his first match for Pápa in a 2-3 loss against Kecskemét in the Hungarian League.

Club

References

External links

1995 births
Living people
Sportspeople from Dunajská Streda
Hungarian footballers
Hungary youth international footballers
Association football midfielders
Győri ETO FC players
Lombard-Pápa TFC footballers
Balmazújvárosi FC players
Szeged-Csanád Grosics Akadémia footballers
Mosonmagyaróvári TE 1904 footballers
Tiszakécske FC footballers
Nemzeti Bajnokság I players
Nemzeti Bajnokság II players